Angus MacKay (born 13 March 1946) is a British former auto racing driver. In 1991 he competed in two rounds of the British Touring Car Championship for R&D Motorsport in a BMW 318is.

Racing record

Complete British Touring Car Championship results
(key) (Races in bold indicate pole position) (Races in italics indicate fastest lap)

References

External links

Angus MacKay at BTCC Pages

1946 births
Living people
British Touring Car Championship drivers